The Phylakopi I culture refers to a "cultural" dating system used for the Cycladic culture that flourished during the early Bronze Age in Greece. It spans the period ca. 2300-2000 BC and was named by Colin Renfrew, after the settlement of Phylakopi on the Cycladic island of Milos. Other archaeologists describe this period as the Early Cycladic III (ECIII).

See also
Grotta-Pelos culture
Keros-Syros culture
Kastri culture
History of the Cyclades
Cycladic art

External links
The Chronology and Terminology of Aegean Prehistory, Dartmouth's Aegean Prehistoric Archaeology

References

Cyclades
Cycladic civilization